Dallas James Beeler (born June 12, 1989) is an American professional baseball pitcher. He played in Major League Baseball (MLB) for the Chicago Cubs in 2014 and 2015.

Career

Amateur career
Beeler attended Jenks High School in Jenks, Oklahoma. The Toronto Blue Jays selected Beeler in the 37th round of the 2008 MLB Draft, but he did not sign. Beeler then enrolled at Oral Roberts University, where he played college baseball for the Oral Roberts Golden Eagles. Beeler underwent Tommy John surgery while at Oral Roberts.

Chicago Cubs
The Chicago Cubs selected Beeler in the 41st round of the 2010 MLB Draft. He started the 2011 season with the Peoria Chiefs of the Class A Midwest League, and was promoted to the Tennessee Smokies of the Class AA Southern League in June. After the 2013 season, the Cubs assigned Beeler to the Arizona Fall League, and then added him to their 40-man roster.

Beeler made his MLB debut on June 28, 2014, vs the Washington Nationals. He singled off Gio González in his first at bat. He was released on March 25, 2017.

Later career
On April 20, 2017, Beeler signed with the Kansas City T-Bones of the American Association of Independent Professional Baseball. He was released on May 5, 2017. Beeler signed with the Sugar Land Skeeters of the Atlantic League of Professional Baseball for the 2018 season.

On July 9, 2018, Beeler signed a minor league deal with the Kansas City Royals. He was released on July 23, 2018. On July 28, 2018, Beeler re-signed with the Sugar Land Skeeters of the Atlantic League of Professional Baseball. He re-signed for the 2019 season.

On January 24, 2020, Beeler signed with the Lincoln Saltdogs of the American Association. However, the Saltdogs were not selected to compete in the condensed 2020 season due to the COVID-19 pandemic. Beeler wasn't chosen in the dispersal draft and became a free agent. On December 3, 2020, Beeler signed with the Saltdogs for the 2021 season, however, he was released on January 25, 2021.

Personal
Beeler is the brother of NFL center Chase Beeler.

References

External links

1989 births
Living people
Sportspeople from Tulsa, Oklahoma
Baseball players from Oklahoma
Major League Baseball pitchers
Chicago Cubs players
Oral Roberts Golden Eagles baseball players
Arizona League Cubs players
Boise Hawks players
Peoria Chiefs players
Tennessee Smokies players
Mesa Solar Sox players
Iowa Cubs players
Kansas City T-Bones players
Sugar Land Skeeters players
Tomateros de Culiacán players
American expatriate baseball players in Mexico